Arthur Spencer Tyrer (born 25 February 1931) is an English former professional footballer. He played in the Football League for Leeds United, Shrewsbury Town and Aldershot. He was born in Manchester.

Tyrer was with Manchester City before joining Cheshire League side Mossley. He worked as a plumber while with Mossley, until turning professional on joining Leeds United in September 1950. The £2000 fee paid by Leeds to Mossley was a record fee for Mossley at that time.

He left Leeds in July 1954, joining non-league Peterborough United, but returned to the Football League with Shrewsbury Town in June 1955. He moved to Aldershot in June 1956 and played over 200 times for the Shots before joining Hereford United in 1964. He later played for Fleet Town.

His brother Fred was a goalkeeper and also played for Mossley during the 1949–50 season.

References

1931 births
Living people
Footballers from Manchester
English footballers
Manchester City F.C. players
Mossley A.F.C. players
Leeds United F.C. players
Peterborough United F.C. players
Shrewsbury Town F.C. players
Aldershot F.C. players
Hereford United F.C. players
English Football League players
Fleet Town F.C. players
Association football wing halves